Winnsboro is a town in Fairfield County, South Carolina, United States. The population was 3,550 at the 2010 census. The population was 3,215 at the 2020 census. A population decrease of approximately 9.5% for the same 10 year period. It is the county seat of Fairfield County. Winnsboro is part of the Columbia, South Carolina metropolitan area. Winnsboro is a suburb of a Columbia, South Carolina.

History
Based on archeological evidence, this area of the Piedmont was occupied by various cultures of indigenous peoples from as early as the Archaic period, about 1500 BC. Blair Mound is a nearby archeological site and earthwork likely occupied 1300-1400 AD, as part of the late Mississippian culture in the region.
 
Several years before the Revolutionary War, Richard Winn from Virginia moved to what is now Fairfield County in the upland or Piedmont area of South Carolina. His lands included the present site of Winnsboro. As early as 1777, the settlement was known as "Winnsborough" since he was the major landowner. His brothers John and Minor Winn joined him there, adding to family founders.

The village was laid out and chartered in 1785 upon petition of Richard and John Winn, and John Vanderhorst. The brothers Richard, John and Minor Winn all served in the Revolutionary War. Richard became a general, and was said to have fought in more battles than any Whig in South Carolina. John gained the rank of colonel. See Fairfield County, South Carolina, for more.

The area was developed for the cultivation of short-staple cotton after Eli Whitney's invention of the cotton gin in 1793, which made processing of this type of cotton profitable. Previously it was considered too labor-intensive. Short-staple cotton was widely cultivated on plantations in upland areas throughout the Deep South, through an interior area that became known as the Black Belt. The increased demand for slave labor resulted in the forced migration of more than one million African-American slaves into the area through sales in the domestic slave market. By the time of the Civil War, the county's population was majority black and majority slave.

Textile mills were constructed in the area beginning in the late 19th century, and originally only whites were allowed to work in the mills. "Winnsboro Cotton Mill Blues", an industrial folk song of the 1930s with lyrics typical of the blues, refers to working in a cotton mill in this city. The song arose after the textile mill had been converted to a tire manufacturing plant, reflecting the widespread expansion of the auto industry. The song has been sung by Lead Belly, Pete Seeger, and other artists. It was the basis of one of the ballads by modernist composer/pianist Frederic Rzewski in his Four North American Ballads for solo piano, completed in 1979.

Places listed on the National Register of Historic Places for Winnsboro range from an Archaic period archeological site, to structures and districts spanning the European-American/African-American history of the city, as in the following list: Albion, Balwearie, Blair Mound, Dr. Walter Brice House and Office, Concord Presbyterian Church, Furman Institution Faculty Residence, Hunstanton, Ketchin Building, Bob Lemmon House, Liberty Universalist Church and Feasterville Academy Historic District, McMeekin Rock Shelter, Mount Olivet Presbyterian Church, New Hope A.R.P. Church and Session House, Old Stone House, Rockton and Rion Railroad Historic District, Rural Point, Shivar Springs Bottling Company Cisterns, The Oaks, Tocaland, White Oak Historic District, and the Winnsboro Historic District. Though not listed on the National Register of Historic Places, the Winnsboro Town Clock built in 1837 is the oldest continuously running clock in the United States.

Geography
Winnsboro is located east of the center of Fairfield County at  (34.377069, -81.087959). U.S. Route 321 and South Carolina Highway 34 bypass the town on the west side. US 321 Business passes through the center of town on Congress Street. US 321 leads north  to Chester and south  to Columbia. SC 34 leads southeast  to Ridgeway and west  to Newberry. SC 200 leads northeast  to Great Falls. The unincorporated community of Winnsboro Mills borders the south side of Winnsboro.

Demographics

2020 census

As of the 2020 United States census, there were 3,215 people, 1,329 households, and 878 families residing in the town.

2010 census
As of the 2010 United States Census, there were 3,550 people, 1,497 households, and 931 families residing in the town.  The racial makeup of the town was 60.3% African American, 36.1% White, 0.2% Native American, 0.3% Asian, 0.1% from other races, and 1.0% from two or more races. Hispanic or Latino of any race were 2.0% of the population.

2000 census
As of the census of 2000, there were 3,564 people, 1,454 households, and 984 families residing in the town. The population density was 1,109.6 people per square mile (428.9/km2). There were 1,597 housing units at an average density of 492.4 per square mile (190.3/km2). The racial makeup of the town was 40.29% White, 58.46% African American, 0.31% Asian, 0.33% from other races, and 0.61% from two or more races. Hispanic or Latino of any race were 1.31% of the population.

There were 1,454 households, out of which 33.2% had children under the age of 18 living with them, 37.7% were married couples living together, 25.4% had a female householder with no husband present, and 32.3% were non-families. 29.7% of all households were made up of individuals, and 14.0% had someone living alone who was 65 years of age or older. The average household size was 2.46 and the average family size was 3.04.

In the town, the population was spread out, with 27.8% under the age of 18, 9.5% from 18 to 24, 24.8% from 25 to 44, 21.6% from 45 to 64, and 16.3% who were 65 years of age or older. The median age was 36 years. For every 100 females, there were 80.5 males. For every 100 females age 18 and over, there were 75.1 males.

The median income for a household in the town was $25,094, and the median income for a family was $29,550. Males had a median income of $29,275 versus $18,925 for females. The per capita income for the town was $14,135. About 23.6% of families and 24.4% of the population were below the poverty line, including 33.9% of those under age 18 and 14.1% of those age 65 or over.

Government
The Mayor of Winnsboro is John McMeekin. Town Council Members: Danny Miller - District #1, Janice Bartell-Prather - District #2, Demetrius Chatman - District #3, Jae Burroughs - District #4. The Town Manager is Jason Taylor.

Education
Fairfield Institute, a school for African Americans run by a missionary from New Jersey was in Winnsboro from 1869 to 1888 when it closed and merged with Brainerd Institute in Chester, South Carolina. Its principal, Rev. Willard Richardson returned to New Jersey with his family. Joseph Winthrop Holley and Kelly Miller attended the school. Winnsboro has a public library, a branch of the Fairfield County Library.

Winnsboro is served by the Fairfield County Public School system. Currently, Fairfield County schools hold a ranking C+, based on the most recent ratings. The school district has 2,414 students in grades PK, K-12 with a student-teacher ratio of 10 to 1. According to state test scores, 25.1% of students are at least proficient in math and 31% in reading. The district on-time graduation rate, according to the South Carolina Department of Education School Report Card, is 78.1%, while the South Carolina state average is 83.3%. For Fiscal Year 2021-2022, the revenue per pupil (student) is $25,790, which is the highest in the state of South Carolina.

Crime
Based on data from the FBI Uniform Crime Reporting (UCR) Program, Winnsboro is ranked 87% higher than the national average for violent crime, 26% higher than the national average for property crime, and 36% higher than the national average for total crime. The rate of crime in Winnsboro is 39.24 per 1,000 residents. The chance of being a victim of crime in Winnsboro may be as high as 1 in 17 in the central neighborhoods, or as low as 1 in 40 in the west part of the city. A crime occurs every 20 hours and 53 minutes (on average) in Winnsboro.

Poverty
The average household income in Winnsboro is $40,553. The poverty rate is 31.86%. The median rental cost is $734 per month, and the median home value is $116,000.

Notable people
D. Wyatt Aiken (1828–1887), U.S. congressman from South Carolina
Mike Anderson, Baltimore Ravens running back, formerly of the Denver Broncos where he was named NFL Offensive Rookie of the Year for the 2000 season
Webster Anderson (1933 – 2003), U.S. Army soldier who received the Medal of Honor, the highest US military award, for his actions in the Vietnam War
John Bratton (1838-1898), Confederate general during the American Civil War; U.S. congressman from South Carolina
Walter B. Brown (1920-1998), former vice-president of Southern Railway (now Norfolk Southern); political figure in South Carolina legislative government
William Porcher DuBose (1836-1918), priest, theologian, educator in the Episcopal Church, and Civil War veteran
William Ellison (1790-1861), Jr., born a mixed-race slave April on the plantation of William Ellison (likely his father) near Winnsboro; he was apprenticed as a cotton gin maker and allowed to buy his freedom in 1816. He had his own business and also became a major planter in Sumter County, where he owned 1000 acres by 1860 and numerous slaves to work that land. 
Gordon Glisson (1930-1997), champion jockey in thoroughbred horse racing
Justin Hobgood, NASCAR driver
James Hooker, singer/songwriter 
Ellis Johnson, college football coach
David Leventritt (1845–1926), New York City lawyer and judge, born in Winnsboro
Donnie Levister, NASCAR driver
James G. Martin, 70th governor of North Carolina (1985-1993)
John Hugh Means (1812-1862), 64th governor of South Carolina (1850–1852); signed South Carolina Ordinance of Secession in 1860; killed at Second Battle of Manassas during Civil War
James Francis Miller (1830-1902), politician who represented Texas in the U.S. House of Representatives from 1883-1886
Kelly Miller (1863-1939), African-American mathematician, sociologist, essayist, newspaper columnist, and author
James Milling, professional football player
Thomas J. Robertson (1823-1897),  U.S. senator from South Carolina
Orlando Ruff, defensive lineman for the New Orleans Saints
Alex Sanders, former Court of Appeals judge, Lt. Governor candidate, College of Charleston president, and Democratic U.S. Senate candidate; resides in Charleston; related to Thomas family of Ridgeway
Miriam Stevenson, Miss South Carolina 1953, Miss South Carolina USA 1954, Miss USA 1954, Miss Universe 1954
Tyler Thigpen, Buffalo Bills quarterback
Joseph A. Woodward (1806-1885), congressman from South Carolina; son of William Woodward

References

External links

Town of Winnsboro official website
101 Congress Street - Winnsboro Town Hall and Clock

Towns in Fairfield County, South Carolina
Towns in South Carolina
County seats in South Carolina
Columbia metropolitan area (South Carolina)